Mount Betty is a small ridge overlooking the Ross Ice Shelf, on the north side of Bigend Saddle, at the north-eastern extremity of the Herbert Range in the Queen Maud Mountains of Antarctica. It was discovered in November 1911 by Captain Roald Amundsen, and named by him for Betty Andersson, nurse and housekeeper in the Amundsen family for many years.

Historic site
A cairn was erected on the ridge by Amundsen on 6 January 1912, on his way back to Framheim from the South Pole. It is known as "Amundsen’s cairn" and has been designated a Historic Site or Monument (HSM 24), following a proposal by Norway to the Antarctic Treaty Consultative Meeting.

References

Mountains of the Ross Dependency
Mount Batty
Mount Batty